The Murderer is Not Guilty (French: L'assassin n'est pas coupable) is a 1946 French crime film directed by René Delacroix and starring Albert Préjean, Jacqueline Gauthier and Jules Berry. A writer investigates after a number of film actors are killed.

Cast

References

Bibliography 
 Rège, Philippe. Encyclopedia of French Film Directors, Volume 1. Scarecrow Press, 2009.

External links 
 

1946 films
1946 crime films
French crime films
1940s French-language films
Films about filmmaking
Gaumont Film Company films
French black-and-white films
1940s French films
Films directed by René Delacroix